The 2008 season is the 17th competitive football season in Estonia.

National Leagues

Meistriliiga

Esiliiga

Estonian FA Cup

National Teams

A Team 

The Estonia national football team' played a total number of fifteen matches (including one unofficial) and started in the qualifying tournament for the 2010 FIFA World Cup in South Africa.

U-21

U-19

U-18

U-17

U-16

U-15

Notes

External links 
 Estonian Football Association

 
Seasons in Estonian football